Asparagus scandens, (also known as climbing asparagus fern or krulkransie) is a plant native to South Africa in the genus Asparagus.

Description
This fine, delicate looking creeper is actually quite hardy. It prefers shady areas and moisture, but can tolerate some drought. Its soft, feathery foliage is a deep, rich green and unlike other asparagus ferns, this species does not grow thorns.

Distribution and habitat
This tough little creeper is indigenous to the shady afro-montane forests of the Western Cape, South Africa. Here it can be found from the indigenous woods and kloofs of Cape Town, eastwards as far as the Tsitsikamma Mountains.

Cultivated in South African gardens, it is a very useful ornamental plant for growing in deep shade. It will climb up any sticks, pillars or trellises that are available, but if there is nothing for it to climb up, it will simply form a thick, feathery groundcover.
It grows many tiny white drooping flowers that are followed by little orange fruits. These attract birds which help to disperse them.
It is best propagated from seed.

A. scandens is an invasive species in some countries. In New Zealand it is listed on the National Pest Plant Accord, which means that it cannot be sold or distributed. In Australia it is listed on the Weeds of National Significance, a list of 32 taxa compiled by the federal government.

References

External links
Asparagus scandens - at the South African National Biodiversity Institute
A. scandens - at the Department of Primary Industries, Victoria, Australia
A. scandens - at the Royal New Zealand Institute of Horticulture.

scandens
Flora of the Cape Provinces
Creepers of South Africa
Garden plants of Africa
Afromontane flora